The Rural Municipality of Silverwood No. 123 is a rural municipality (RM) in the Canadian province of Saskatchewan within Census Division No. 5 and  Division No. 1. It is located in the southeast portion of the province.

History 
The RM of Silverwood No. 123 incorporated as a rural municipality on October 31, 1911.

Geography 
The Great Blue Heron (Ardea herodias), a species of special concern, makes its home in this area.

Communities and localities 
The following unincorporated communities are within the RM.

Localities
Fairmede
Langbank
St. Hubert
Vandura

Demographics 

Government 
The RM of Silverwood No. 123 is governed by an elected municipal council and an appointed administrator that meets on the second Thursday of every month. The reeve of the RM is William MacPherson while its administrator is Jennalee Beutler. The RM's office is located in Whitewood.

References 

Silverwood
Division No. 5, Saskatchewan